Stachyneura is a genus of moths of the family Xyloryctidae.

Species
 Stachyneura iostigma Diakonoff, 1948
 Stachyneura sceliphrodes (Meyrick, 1925)

References

Xyloryctidae
Xyloryctidae genera